Michael Philbrick (born October 22, 1967) is a former Canadian football defensive lineman in the Canadian Football League who played for the Ottawa Rough Riders and Hamilton Tiger-Cats. He played CIS football for the Carleton Ravens.

References

1967 births
Living people
Players of Canadian football from Ontario
Canadian football defensive linemen
Ottawa Rough Riders players
Hamilton Tiger-Cats players
Carleton Ravens football players